The discography of American musician Izzy Stradlin consists of 11 studio albums (including his work with Izzy Stradlin and the Ju Ju Hounds band), 1 extended play and 11 singles.

Studio albums

Izzy Stradlin and the Ju Ju Hounds

Solo

Extended plays

Singles

Izzy Stradlin and the Ju Ju Hounds

Solo

Band work

With Guns N' Roses

With Hollywood Rose

Demos

References 

Rock music discographies
Discographies of American artists
Discography